is a Japanese animator, storyboard artist, and director known for panty-fanservice.

Films
Project A-ko (1986), director
Project A-ko: Grey Side/Blue Side (1990), director
Honō no Tenkōsei (1991), Director, Animation Director
Megami Paradise (1995), director
Sailor Victory (1995), director
Agent Aika (1997), director, storyboard
Labyrinth of Flames (2000), director, storyboard
Najica Blitz Tactics (2001), director
Office Lingerie (2001), director
Kirameki Project (2005), director
Aika R-16: Virgin Mission (2007), director, storyboard
G-Taste (2010), director
Nozoki Ana (2013), director

References

External links

 
 
 Katsuhiko Nishijima profile page at Oricon Style 

1960 births
Living people
Anime directors
People from Funabashi